Robert Stack Pierce (June 15, 1933 – March 1, 2016) was a Hollywood actor who was previously a boxer and professional baseball player. His acting career began in the early 1970s with television roles in the series Arnie, Room 222, Mannix,  Mission Impossible and later as Jake, the alien commander in the 1980s science fiction series V. His film roles include Night Call Nurses, Hammer,  Cool Breeze, Low Blow and Weekend at Bernie's II.

Background
Pierce was state boxing champion. Later he played professional baseball, beginning with the Cleveland Indians organization and later the Milwaukee Braves organization.
Having left high school, he joined up to the army where he was an Airborne Engineer. While in the army he played baseball in the Special Services. He came up on the radar of the Cleveland Indians and he was signed to a Major League contract. Not long after the Milwaukee Braves bought his contract and was with them for six years until his retirement in 1960. Later he moved to Los Angeles with his wife.

He has had prominent and recurring roles in a number of Leo Fong exploitation films as well as a few Fred Williamson films. Among the films in which he appeared with Williamson are Hammer (1972), No way Back (1976, in the part of Bernie). Others included, The Big Score (1983), The Messenger (1986) and Transformed (2005).

He has appeared on Michael Dante's radio show, On Deck.

Acting career

1960s to 1970s
Pierce's entry into acting came about as a result of his wife's encouragement. She pushed him to audition for his first play, Ebonites. He was diligent in studying acting and did a lot of work with a repertory company.

Pierce first appeared on television in a 1970 episode of Arnie. He moved into film roles in 1972, appearing in three films that year: he played the henchman, Tinker, in Cool Breeze; played the role of Jon Sampson in the Jonathan Kaplan directed Night Call Nurses; and appeared in Hammer, his first of five films, over his career, that starred Fred Williamson.

1980s
In 1980, Pierce played Frank Washington in The Last Reunion, his first of seven films, over his career, that starred Leo Fong. In 1980, Pierce was nominated for an NAACP Image Award for his role in the "Sweet Land of Liberty" episode of the television series Quincy, M.E..

He also appeared with Wings Hauser and Beverly Todd in the 1982 cult classic grindhouse film Vice Squad, playing a garage owner who Hauser heads for after escaping from the police. In 1983, he appeared as Captain Jake, the alien commander in the science fiction television series V. In 1984, he was in another Leo Fong film, Killpoint, appearing as Nighthawk, the stone faced henchman for a weapons dealer. In 1986, he was in another Fong film, Low Blow as Duke, in a story about the daughter of a wealthy businessman who was kidnapped by a religious cult and a detective who was hired to get her back.

1990s to 2000s
In 1997, Pierce appeared as Will in Paolo Mazzucato's Moonbase, a film about a crew running a garbage dump on the moon and having to ward off deranged escaped inmates from an orbiting prison satellite who are after nuclear weapons buried in the rubbish.

Pierce then stepped away from acting, caring for his wife, Marion, until she died of cancer in June, 1998. In the years after her death, he became a stage director, including productions of  A Raisin in the Sun, My Brothers' Blood, In My Father's House and One Last Look.

Pierce made a brief return to acting for the 2005 direct-to-video release Transformed, reuniting with Leo Fong.

Later activities
As he scaled down his acting career, Pierce became involved with youth and charity work.

He revisited baseball, becoming a youth coach in 2006. He booked speaking engagements through Speakers International.

In August 2011, he was involved in the Lenny Wilkens Foundation fundraiser for the Odessa Brown Children's Clinic. In December 2011, Pierce was one of the celebrity golfers in the Dennis James Golf Classic's 16th annual tournament.

Pierce had to step back from coaching baseball after he suffered a stroke in 2012. Despite this, he was able to continue his involvement in charity work. On August 28, 2014, Pierce participated in the 13th annual Jim "Mudcat" Grant golf tournament in Binghamton, New York. Amongst the other celebrities participating in 2014 was Fred Williamson, whom Pierce had worked with in a number of films.

Awards
In July 1978, Pierce, along with musicians Side Effect and D. J. Rogers, was at Reve Gibson's annual Youth On Parade program to pick up an award.

Death
Pierce died on March 1, 2016.

Filmography

 Cool Breeze (1972) .... Tinker
 Night Call Nurses (1972) .... Jon Sampson
 Hammer (1972) .... Roughhouse
 Trouble Man (1972) .... Collie
 Jarrett (1973, TV Movie) .... Prison guard
 Trader Horn (1973) .... Malugi
 Cleopatra Jones (1973) .... Minor Role (uncredited)
 The Healers (1974, TV Movie)
 Newman's Law (1974) .... Baines
 The Law (1974, TV Movie) .... Bright's Guard, County Jail
 A Cry for Help (1975, TV Movie) .... Sgt. Mike Reese
 The Prisoner of Second Avenue (1975) .... Detective
 Cornbread, Earl and Me (1975) .... Sam Hamilton
 Killer Force (1975) .... Emilio
 The Six Million Dollar Man (1976, TV Series) .... Officer Randolph
 Kiss Me, Kill Me (1976, TV Movie) .... Sergent
 No Way Back (1976) .... Bernie
 The Greatest (1977) .... Johnson
 Lucy Calls the President (1977, TV Movie) .... Secret Service Agent Stockley
 Good Guys Wear Black (1978) .... Holly Washington – The Black Tigers
 Flesh & Blood (1979, TV Movie) .... Big Moony
 The Last Reunion (1980) .... Frank Washington
 The Incredible Hulk (1977-1982) .... Cop / Sgt. Nicholson
 Alcatraz: The Whole Shocking Story (1980, TV Movie) .... Presser
 Charlie and the Great Balloon Chase (1981, TV Movie) .... Lucas
 Vice Squad (1982) .... Roscoe
 V (1983, TV Mini-Series) .... Visitor Captain Jake
 WarGames (1983) .... Airman
 The Big Score (1983) .... New
 Sawyer and Finn (1983, TV Movie) .... Jim
 Killpoint (1984) .... Nighthawk
 V: The Final Battle (1984, TV Mini-Series) .... Visitor Captain Jake
 24 Hours to Midnight (1985) .... White Powder Chan
 Born American (1986) .... The Admiral (voice, uncredited)
 Low Blow (1986) .... Corky
 The Patriot (1986) .... Atkins
 The Messenger (1986) .... Leroy
 I Saw What You Did (1988, TV Movie) .... Policeman
 It's Murphy's Fault (1988) .... Spider Jackson
 Blood Street (1988) .... Solomon
 Enemy Unseen (1989) .... Josh
 No witnesses (1990)
 A Rage in Harlem (1991) .... Coffin Ed
 Weekend at Bernie's II (1993) .... Claudia's Dad
 Out of Darkness (1994, TV Movie) .... Dr Brook
 Human Desires (1997) .... Smokey
 Moonbase (1997) .... Will
 Transformed (2005) .... The mayor (final film role)

References

External links
 
 
 Stack Pierce at Aveleyman
 
 NAACP Image Awards in the category Best Performance by an Actor in a Television Dramatic Series for Quincy: "Sweet Land of Liberty"The Carolina Times Sat, December 13, 1980 - Article Page 5 NBC Stars and Shows Nominated for NAACP Awards

American male film actors
American male soap opera actors
African-American male actors
American male television actors
1933 births
2016 deaths
American male stage actors
20th-century African-American people
21st-century African-American people